Mount Pleasant Cemetery is a historic rural cemetery in the North Ward of Newark in Essex County, New Jersey, United States.  It is located on the west bank of the Passaic River in Newark's Broadway neighborhood, opposite Kearny.  It occupies approximately 40 acres (162,000 m²) and was designed by Horace Baldwin.  The cemetery is listed on both the New Jersey Register (ID #1284, since 1987) and the National Register of Historic Places (Reference #87000836, since 1988).

The graves of some of Newark's most eminent citizens are within Mount Pleasant Cemetery.  The cemetery is dominated by the marble mausoleum of John Fairfield Dryden, the founder of Prudential Financial.  Other notable interments include Marcus Lawrence Ward, Governor of New Jersey; Seth Boyden, inventor of patent leather; and Mary Stillman, first wife of Thomas Edison. Mount Pleasant also contains graves of members of the Kinney, Ballantine, and Frelinghuysen families.

The cemetery itself was opened and incorporated in 1844, but there are graves that date back to the mid-17th century, which were moved from older graveyards that were crowded out due to development.

Notable burials

 Peter Ballantine (1791–1883)
 Seth Boyden (1788–1870), inventor of patent leather
 Joseph Philo Bradley (1813–1892), Associate Justice of the Supreme Court of the United States, served on the Electoral Commission that decided the disputed 1876 presidential election
 Amanda Minnie Douglas (1831–1916), writer
 John F. Dryden (1839–1911), United States Senator and founder of Prudential Financial
 Frederick Theodore Frelinghuysen (1817–1885), member of the United States Senate representing New Jersey and a United States Secretary of State
 Charles Alling Gifford (1860-1937), architect
 Edward W. Gray (1870–1942), represented New Jersey's 8th congressional district from 1915–1919
 George A. Halsey (1827–1894), represented New Jersey's 7th congressional district from 1867–1869 and 1871–1873
 Augustus A. Hardenbergh (1830–1889), represented New Jersey's 7th congressional district from 1875–1879 and 1881–1883
 Franklin Murphy (1846–1920), 31st Governor of New Jersey
 Charles Wolcott Parker (1862–1948), Associate Justice of the Supreme Court of New Jersey from 1907–1947
 Thomas Baldwin Peddie (1808–1889), Mayor of Newark
 Alexander C.M. Pennington (1810–1867), represented  from 1853–1857
 William Pennington (1796–1862), 13th Governor of New Jersey and Speaker of the House during his single term in Congress
 Nehemiah Perry (1816–1881), member of the United States House of Representatives from New Jersey, Mayor of Newark
 Theodore Runyon (1822–1896), Civil War general, Newark mayor, and U.S. ambassador to Germany
 Marcus Lawrence Ward (1812–1884), 21st Governor of New Jersey and represented the state in Congress for one term

See also

 Fairmount Cemetery, Newark
 List of cemeteries in New Jersey
 National Register of Historic Places listings in Essex County, New Jersey

References

External links 
 Political Graveyard interment information for Mount Pleasant Cemetery
 Mount Pleasant Cemetery at Find a Grave
 A newarkhistory.com feature on mausoleums of Mt. Pleasant Cemetery
 Mount Pleasant Cemetery Home Page

Cemeteries in Newark, New Jersey
1844 establishments in New Jersey
Geography of Newark, New Jersey
National Register of Historic Places in Newark, New Jersey
Historic districts in Essex County, New Jersey
Historic districts on the National Register of Historic Places in New Jersey
Rural cemeteries